The 2015 IAAF World Challenge was the sixth edition of the annual, global circuit of one-day track and field competitions organized by the International Association of Athletics Federations (IAAF). The series featured a total of thirteen meetings – the same number as the previous year as the Grande Premio Brasil Caixa de Atletismo was dropped and the IAAF World Challenge Dakar was added to the schedule.

Schedule

References

External links
Official website

2015
World Challenge Meetings